Puttenahalli Lake may refer to:
Puttenahalli Lake (Yelahanka), a lake in North Bengaluru, Karnataka, India
Puttenahalli Lake (JP Nagar), a lake in South Bengaluru, Karnataka, India